is a Japanese footballer who plays as a midfielder.

Career

Youth

At the age of 6, Hosoe moved to Malaysia due to his father's work.

Toshiya played for Chukyo University of Japan and Kuala Lumpur Youth Soccer of Malaysia in youth leagues. He played in Gothia Cup, where he developed as a player.

Club

Melbourne Sharks

After high school, Toshiya went on to join Victoria based Melbourne Sharks in 2011, played in Victorian State League Division 1.

Kaya
At the end of 2012 Thoshiya joined Philippines UFL club Kaya FC.
He stayed with Kaya for two seasons.

New Youngs
Toshiya was then signed by New Young's SC for 2014–15 Sri Lanka Football Premier League.

Maziya
Toshiya joined Dhivehi Premier League club Maziya S&RC in 2015. He featured for Maziya in six of their seven 2015 AFC Cup games.

Minerva Punjab
Toshiya was signed by Minerva Punjab FC for 2016–17 I-League season. He made his debut for the club against Mohun Bagan.

Career statistics

References

External links
 
 

1991 births
Living people
Japanese expatriate footballers
Association football midfielders
I-League players
Expatriate footballers in India
Japanese footballers
Japanese expatriate sportspeople in Malaysia
Expatriate footballers in the Maldives
Expatriate soccer players in Australia
Port Melbourne SC players
Expatriate footballers in Sri Lanka
Expatriate footballers in the Philippines
Kaya F.C. players
Japanese expatriate sportspeople in the Philippines
Expatriate footballers in Malaysia
Sri Lanka Football Premier League players